Number 13 is a comic strip that appeared in the UK comic The Beano. It made its first appearance in issue 2333, dated 4 April 1987, and ran until 1997, although it became sporadic during the last few years. A couple of one-off appearances followed up until issue, dated 14 December 2002. It was originally drawn by John Geering. It returned in January 2014, written and drawn by Alan Ryan.  The strip features the residents of the house of the same name, who are:

 Boris- The son, a vampire.
 Dad- Boris' father, also a vampire.
 Frankie- The butler, a Frankenstein-like character.
 Mum- Boris' mother, also a vampire.
 Gran- Boris' grandma, a witch.
 Tiddles- One of their pets, a Smilodon (or Sabretooth Cat).
 Fiendish- Their other pet, a bat.

Other characters included Uncle Wolfie (a werewolf) and Frankie's pet brick, Sabre.

References 

Beano strips